"Eyes on You" is a song co-written and recorded by American country music artist Chase Rice. It was released to radio on August 13, 2018 as the second single from his second studio album Lambs & Lions. The song was written by Rice, Chris DeStefano and Ashley Gorley.

Content
The song is about an actual experience that Rice had with a female friend in Hawaii. The song expresses nostalgia about experiencing a special night with a lover. It is accompanied mainly by keyboard and guitar. Rice said of the song, "It's got an unbelievable melody to it, and then the storyline -- everyday wants that. Every guy wants to look at a girl like that. Every girl wants her guy looking at her like that. So I think it just connects to people in terms of what they want in life. It's probably my biggest song as an artist to date."

Commercial performance
The song has sold 77,000 copies in the United States as of April 2019.

Music video
The song received a music video, which features his former girlfriend. He tore a pectoral muscle while shooting the video. Brian Lazarro directed the video, which was filmed in Mammoth Lakes, CA.

Charts

Weekly charts

Year-end charts

Certifications

References

2017 songs
2018 singles
Chase Rice songs
BBR Music Group singles
Songs written by Chris DeStefano
Songs written by Ashley Gorley
Songs written by Chase Rice